Woodrow is an unincorporated community in Pocahontas County, West Virginia, United States.

The community was named after Woodrow Wilson, 28th President of the United States.

References

Unincorporated communities in Pocahontas County, West Virginia
Unincorporated communities in West Virginia